Naked Hearts is a 1966 French drama film directed by Édouard Luntz. It was entered into the 16th Berlin International Film Festival.

The film tells the story of a group of young people from Nanterre, a suburb to the west of Paris. The main characters, Zim and Jean-Pierre, are part of a gang of greasers (referred to in French as «blousons noirs»), and meet in prison at the beginning of the film. The narrative traces their efforts to negotiate the dynamics of the group, find a job, and stay out of trouble (both are on provisional release after their initial brush with the law).

Naked Hearts is unusual for its period in its use of non-professional actors and for its mix of narrative and documentary elements. The group of young men at the center of the film is composed of residents of Nanterre, and Luntz purportedly worked closely with them in writing the story. Segments of voiceover appear at several points in the film, apparently recorded conversations with young people from the area.

Cast
 Gérard Zimmermann as Zim
 Marise Maire as Jacqueline
 Eric Penet as Jean-Pierre
 Françoise Bonneau as Patricia
 Arlette Thomas as Jean-Pierre's Mother
 Elliott Stein
 Paul Préboist

References

External links

1966 films
1960s French-language films
1966 drama films
Films directed by Édouard Luntz
French black-and-white films
1960s teen drama films
Films scored by Serge Gainsbourg
1960s gang films
1960s French films